State Intelligence Service may refer to;

State Intelligence Service (Albania)
State Intelligence Service (Sri Lanka), formally the National Intelligence Bureau
State Intelligence Services (The Gambia), formerly National Intelligence Agency (NIA)

See also
National Intelligence Service (disambiguation)
Foreign Intelligence service (disambiguation)
Federal Intelligence Service (disambiguation)
General Intelligence Directorate (disambiguation)
Directorate of Military Intelligence (disambiguation)
Intelligence Bureau (disambiguation)